Big Star: Nothing Can Hurt Me is a 2012 documentary film about American rock band Big Star, directed by Drew DeNicola and Olivia Mori.

Cast
 Jon Auer
 Chris Bell
 Alex Chilton
 Rick Clark
 Tav Falco
 Andy Hummel
 John Lightman
 Jody Stephens
 Ken Stringfellow

Summary
The film chronicles the critical acclaim, lack of commercial success and the cult following of the band.

Reception
On review aggregator Rotten Tomatoes, the film received a 92% approval rating, from 39 critics, with an average score of 7.1/10. The website's critics consensus reads: "Big Star: Nothing Can Hurt Me offers a persuasive argument for its subjects' cult classic oeuvre -- and presents a painfully passionate lament for their untapped potential."
The Village Voice's Stephanie Zacharek praised director Drew DiNicola's documentary, writing that it "honors that sense of mystery, telling the band's story as if whispering it through the cracks in a wall. There's very little footage of the band themselves—their elusive magic found its truest expression in the studio rather than before a live audience."

References

External links
 

2012 films
2012 documentary films
Rockumentaries
Big Star
American documentary films
2010s English-language films
2010s American films